Jay Edward Adams (January 30, 1929 – November 14, 2020) was an American Presbyterian author who  wrote more than 100 books. His books have been translated into 16 languages, and he received his doctorate in preaching.

Nouthetic counseling
According to an interview by Aaron Blumer, Adams' major influence on counseling was the publication of his book Competent to Counsel in 1970.  It is from that book that Adams developed what is known as nouthetic counseling.  Over time, Adams has become a popular advocate of "strictly biblical approaches" to counseling, whose "perspectives are influencing evangelical Christianity today."

John F. MacArthur has stated that through Adams' book Competent to Counsel Adams gave the Church "an indispensable corrective to several trends that are eating away at the Church's spiritual vitality".  Derek Tidball argues that Adams has made an "enormous contribution to the revival of biblical pastoral theology". According to Ian F. Jones, Tim Clinton, and George Ohlschlager, "Jay Adams brought a biblical revolution to Christian and pastoral counseling in the 1970s, challenging a field that was racing toward rancor, even dissolution by its fascination with all manner of anti-Christian psycho-babble."  David Powlison has said that Adams has written "abundant resources for the development of counseling" and has led to the establishment of various institutions based on his views.

Psychologists have argued that nouthetic counseling can do considerable harm to patients. In addition to techniques which critics consider ineffective, patients who are not helped by nouthetic counseling often consider themselves religious failures.  Further criticism comes from The Baker Encyclopedia of Psychology and Counseling, which states that "Adams seems to be not fully knowledgeable regarding the theories he criticizes" and that "confrontation is also essential to the theory of Adams." However, it does go on to state that this confrontation "is defined as caring confrontation."

Mark McMinn has argued, however, that "Dr. Adams has received a great deal of unfair, uninformed criticism from the Christian counseling community. Although I do not share Dr. Adams' opinion on confronting sin in counseling, I do respect his pioneering work in biblical counseling."

Education
Bachelor of Divinity Reformed Episcopal Seminary
Bachelor of Arts in Classics Johns Hopkins University
Masters in Sacred Theology Temple University
PhD in Speech University of Missouri

Publications

Adams wrote more than 100 books, including:

 - originally 1973

 - originally 1970

How to Overcome Evil. P & R Publishing. 1977. .

References

Bibliography
 .

External links
 .
 
 The Institute for Nouthetic Studies

1929 births
2020 deaths
Writers from Baltimore
Presbyterians from Maryland
Presbyterian writers
Associate Reformed Presbyterian Church
Reformed Episcopal Seminary alumni
Christian counselors
University of Missouri alumni
Temple University alumni
Johns Hopkins University alumni
Westminster Theological Seminary faculty